The Mighty Boosh is a British comedy television show created by Julian Barratt, Noel Fielding and others (collectively known as The Mighty Boosh). A surreal comic fantasy, it often featured elaborate musical numbers in different genres, such as electro, heavy metal, funk, and rap. The show is known for popularising a style called "crimping"; short a cappella songs which are present throughout all three series. Julian Barratt wrote the music within the show, and performed it with Noel Fielding. Fielding also designed many of the show's graphics and artwork.

The show takes place in a surreal universe following Howard Moon (Barratt) and Vince Noir (Fielding), two eccentric, failing musicians, as well as Naboo, a mystic alien shaman, and Bollo, a gorilla and Naboo's familiar. They frequently have adventures while they pursue fame.

The series has many animated sequences, puppets and special effects. Barratt has said that he approached Fielding with the idea of doing a show like The Goodies, as if it were a complete "world" rather than simply a sketch show. Barratt and Fielding play many of the recurring and one-off characters themselves, with other characters being played by other Boosh members Rich Fulcher, Dave Brown, and Michael Fielding.

In 2019, The Mighty Boosh was ranked 98th on The Guardians list of the 100 best TV shows of the 21st century.

Format

The Mighty Boosh centres on the adventures of Howard Moon (Barratt) and Vince Noir (Fielding). Series 1 opens and often closes with Howard and Vince addressing the audience in front of a theatre curtain, introducing the show and offering some final reflections. Series 2 leaves this format, instead starting in the characters' flat, with no direct address to the audience. Unlike the radio series, which is played as though real, the characters on the TV series all seem aware that they are in a TV show, and Vince especially will often break the fourth wall to address the audience and to comment on the situation. Little attention is paid to continuity; for instance, in the second series the shaman Saboo is shown being killed by the demon Nanatoo, but in series 3 he is alive and well. In the first series episode, 'Bollo', Bollo the gorilla dies at the end of the episode, before the credits. However, in subsequent episodes, Bollo is also seen alive and well.

Each series of the show featured Howard and Vince and the various recurring characters in a different context; in series 1 Howard and Vince are zookeepers in the "Zooniverse", Naboo is a fellow employee of the zoo and Bollo is one of the animals that live there. In series 2, Howard, Vince, Naboo and Bollo are flatmates in a district of London. In series 3, Howard and Vince work in Naboo's magical shop, the Nabootique, and plots often revolve around them getting in trouble whilst Naboo and Bollo are away from the shop.

Several episodes featured a "crimp"; a humorous a cappella nonsense song sung by Fielding and Barratt. The crimps were sung in a scat style and were lyrically characterized by non-sequiturs that were rhythmically similar to beatboxing, often accompanied by a small performance of hand gestures and pantomimes. The term was first coined in "The Power of the Crimp", episode 3 of the third season. Controversy arose in March 2008 when a new advertisement campaign for the cereal Sugar Puffs was shown to have imitated the particular style of crimping.

Characters

Though there are many recurring characters, the "central cast" consists of five characters:
 Howard Moon (Julian Barratt)
 Vince Noir (Noel Fielding)
 Naboo (Michael Fielding)
 Bollo (Peter Elliott (2004), Dave Brown (2005–2007))
 Bob Fossil (Rich Fulcher)

Recurring characters include:
 Dennis (Julian Barratt)
 Dixon Bainbridge (originally Richard Ayoade, later Matt Berry)
 The Hitcher (Noel Fielding)
 Kirk (Kirk Gaitskell-Kendrick)
 Lester Corncrake (Rich Fulcher)
 The Moon (Noel Fielding)
 Old Gregg (Noel Fielding)
 Rudi van DiSarzio (Julian Barratt)
 Saboo (Richard Ayoade)
 Tony Harrison (Noel Fielding)

Notable guest actors and actresses include:
 Dee Plume and Sue Denim ("Mutants", "Electro", "Nanageddon", "The Strange Tale of the Crack Fox")
 Gary Numan ("The Power of the Crimp")
 The Horrors ("The Chokes")
 Razorlight and Roger Daltrey ("The Priest and the Beast")
 Diva Zappa ("Party")

History

The Mighty Boosh made the transition from radio to television in 2004, when an eight-part television series - called The Mighty Boosh - was commissioned by the BBC. It was directed by Paul King and produced by Baby Cow Productions. The pilot episode was directed by Steve Bendelack, and a large portion of the pilot episode was used in the actual series, in the episode Tundra. The pilot was shot with a live audience because there had been doubts as to whether the successful stage show could translate to the screen, but the actual series had no live audience.

Series 1 of the television version of The Mighty Boosh expanded on the radio series. It was first broadcast on BBC Three on 18 May 2004 and, from 9 November, also on BBC Two, although in a different order and with the mild swearing censored or edited out.

The second series began showing on BBC Three on 26 July 2005, though with a smaller budget. A full-length preview of the following week's episode was available online at the BBC's Boosh webpage. Series 3 started airing on BBC Three from 15 November 2007.

Series 3 began airing on America's Adult Swim on 29 March 2009. Series 1 aired on Adult Swim on 10 May 2009 with Series 2 airing on 5 July 2009.

The first series was shot on standard definition tape and digitally altered with the film look process. Both subsequent series were shot on digital at 25 frames per second.

Controversy 
In 2020, Netflix removed The Mighty Boosh from its catalogue, citing the use of blackface in skits such as "The Spirit of Jazz" (where Fielding portrays the ghost of "Howlin' Jimmy Jefferson"), as well as the fifth episode of the first season, "Jungle." Comedian Jack Carroll tweeted that the removal was "an arbitrary gesture that means [Netflix] don't have to put any real work into combatting actual instances of racial discrimination."

Episodes

Series overview

Series 1 (2004)

Series 2 (2005)

Series 3 (2007)

Media

DVD releases
In the UK the Mighty Boosh has released Series 1-3 individually and in a few boxsets. Series 1 was released on DVD (Region 2) on 29 August 2005, Series 2 on 13 February 2006 and Series 3 was released on 11 February 2008.

As a result of a growing fan base in the U.S. the BBC released seasons 1-3 individually on North American NTSC-formatted DVDs on 21 July 2009. The North American series 1-3 boxset was released on 13 October 2009.

Notes

External links

 

2004 British television series debuts
2007 British television series endings
2000s British sitcoms
BBC television sitcoms
British fantasy television series
Demons in television
Mermaids in television
Race-related controversies in television
British surreal comedy television series
Television about magic
Television series about ghosts
The Mighty Boosh
Wizards in television
Yeti in fiction
Fiction about zoos